Unbreakable: The Fragile Remixes is an album released by British band Dead or Alive in 2001 which served as a companion piece to their 2000 album Fragile. Unbreakable contains ten tracks which are remixes of Fragile songs (some of which were already remakes of past Dead or Alive songs that have been released on their past albums). This record has only been released in Japan from Avex Trax. The album remained an exclusive in this territory until the worldwide release of the Sophisticated Boom Box MMXVI compilation box set in 2016.

A double clear vinyl version was released on Record Store Day 2017 by Demon Records with new artwork as a companion to the Sophisticated Boom Box MMXVI - The Vinyl LP Collection'.

Track listing
"Turn Around and Count 2 Ten" (Y&Co. "B" Mix) - 7:54
"You Spin Me Round (Like a Record)" (Zi Zone Mix) - 4:36
"My Heart Goes Bang" (Love Machine Remix) - 5:06
"Something in My House" (Deadend of Eurasia Mix) - 5:43 
"Hit and Run Lover" (Ventura Mix) - 5:01
"Isn't It a Pity" (Bustard Remix) - 5:15
"I Paralyze" (B4 ZA BEAT Remix) - 6:35
"Blue Christmas" (P.K.G. Remix) - 4:33
"Lover, Come Back to Me" (Earthquake Mix) - 9:31
"Just What I Always Wanted" (R.M. Hyper Techno Mix) - 4:48

Dead or Alive (band) compilation albums
2001 remix albums
Epic Records remix albums